Maehata (written: 前畑 or 前端) is a Japanese surname. Notable people with the surname include:

, Japanese lacquer artist
, Japanese swimmer

See also
9870 Maehata, main-belt asteroid

Japanese-language surnames